Playing with Fire (Spanish title: Jugar con fuego) is an American television series produced by Telemundo International Studios and Globo for Telemundo based on the 2014 Brazilian miniseries written by George Moura, Amores Roubados. It premiered on 22 January 2019 and ended on 4 February 2019

A total of 10 episodes were confirmed for the limited series. The cast was announced on 10 December 2018.

Plot 
Fabrizio is an attractive and sensual man, who bursts into the lives of three women, Camila and Martina, married women who are great friends, and Andrea, Martina’s daughter. His arrival from Mexico will disrupt, in a terrible and permanent way, the life of the homes in the prosperous Colombian coffee zone.

Cast 
 Jason Day as Fabrizio
 Margarita Rosa de Francisco as Martina
 Carlos Ponce as Jorge Jaramillo
 Gaby Espino as Camila
 Laura Perico as Andrea Jaramillo
 Alejandro Aguilar as Gildardo
 Tony Plana as Peter
 Marcelo Serrado as Thiago
 Leticia Huijara as Dolores
 Germán Quintero as Don Andrés
 Luis Alberti as Poncho
 Ricardo Vesga as Eliseo
 Yuri Vargas as Maricarmen
 Alvaro Rodríguez as Hilario
 Juan David Restrepo as Comandante Sánchez

Ratings 
   
}}

Episodes

References

External links 
 
 

Telemundo telenovelas
2019 American television series debuts
2019 telenovelas
American telenovelas
Spanish-language American telenovelas
American television series based on Brazilian television series
2019 American television series endings
Spanish-language Netflix original programming